Phelim Comerford (birth unknown) is an Irish former professional rugby league footballer who played in the 1990s.

International honours
Comerford won 5 caps for Ireland in 1995–1997 while at Dublin Blues.

References

Living people
Dublin Blues Rugby League players
Ireland national rugby league team players
Irish rugby league players
Place of birth missing (living people)
Rugby league players from County Dublin
Rugby league wingers
Year of birth missing (living people)